The Brassington Formation is a geological formation in the United Kingdom, and the country's most significant onshore Miocene deposit. it is preserved as around 60 inliers in karsts of Carboniferous limestone, specifically the Peak Limestone Group, in a triangular region on the borders of the Staffordshire and Derbyshire counties. The lithology largely consists of unconsolidated sand with clay and minor silt components. Pebble beds are also a significant component. It is divided up into three members, which are in ascending order the Kirkham Member, Bees Nest Member and the Kenslow Member. The Kenslow Member is dated to the Serravallian to Tortonian stages based on palynology.

Lithology
The main source rocks for the Brassington Formation are the Triassic sandstones of the Sherwood Sandstone Group.

Kirkham Member
The Lithology of the Kirkham member consists of up to 40–50 m of cream or white coloured (originally red coloured) kaolinitic fluvial derived unfossiliferous sand, gravel and pebble beds, possibly with local cementation.

Bees Nest Member
The lithology of the Bees Nest Member consists of interbedded mottled sandy and silty clays of varying colours (green, grey, red and yellow brown), it is 6 m thick in the Bees Nest pit and up to 21 m in the Kenslow Pit. It represents a low energy aquatic or lacustrine depositional setting

Kenslow Member
The Lithology of the Kenslow Member consists of up to 6 m of massive lacustrine grey coloured clay, with the uppermost parts containing abundant wood fragments preserved as mummifications. It was deposited in a  shallow lacustrine to swampy setting. Some outcrops of the Kenslow Member have lignite lenses.

Paleoenvironmental interpretation 
The vegetation from the Kenslow member suggests a subtropical, seasonally wet climate, with a temperature range of 23.6-28.3°C for the warmest month, and 1.8-12.5°C for the coldest month.  The palynomorph assemblage is dominated by pollen of the genera Picea, Pinus, Tsuga and Sciadopitys, the last of which today is confined to a single species in Japan. It was probably deposited close to sea level, but a significant distance from the sea. Fossil wood and pollen referable to the genus Cryptomeria has also been found. Fossil fungi have also been reported from the Kenslow Member.

References

Geology of England
Geologic formations of the United Kingdom